Anania metaleuca is a moth in the family Crambidae. It was described by George Hampson in 1913. It is found in Tanzania.

References

Endemic fauna of Tanzania
Moths described in 1913
Pyraustinae
Moths of Africa